Edward "Ted" Sullivan is an American television writer.

Early life
Sullivan is a graduate of the University of Southern California Film Writing School, where he also taught as an adjunct professor of screenwriting.

Career
Sullivan began his writing career with the daytime dramas As the World Turns and One Life to Live, before transitioning into directing and producing with the Off-Broadway comedy productions of "What If We Did This?" and "We're Not That Way."

He directed and edited commercials, documentaries and new media campaigns for various companies, including ABC Network, Pollinator Press, Saab and Holiday Inn Express.  In 2007, he co-wrote, edited and produced the independent family comedy I'll Believe You starring David Alan Basche, Patrick Warburton and Chris Elliott.  The film was directed and co-written by his TV producer brother Paul Francis Sullivan.

He wrote for Law & Order: Criminal Intent, starring Jeff Goldblum and Saffron Burrows and Rizzoli & Isles with Angie Harmon and Sasha Alexander., and he wrote for Supergirl

He currently writes for Star Trek: Discovery

Revenge
He wrote for ABC's Revenge, starring Emily VanCamp and Madeleine Stowe.

He is also co-writer of the Marvel Graphic Novel Revenge: The Secret Origin of Emily Thorne.

References

External links

I'll Believe You film trailer
I'll Believe You at Hulu.com
DISCOVER SECRETS IN THE REVENGE ORIGINAL GRAPHIC NOVEL, Marvel.com
Marvel Comics First Look: "The Secret Origin of Emily Thorne", ABC.go.com
Revenge: The Secret Origin of Emily Thorne - Your First Look at the Art
Behind-The-Scenes of Season 2 of Revenge on Nightline
ABC's 'Revenge' soap opera spills into graphic novel, USAToday
EMILY THORNE'S SECRET ORIGINS DETAILED IN MARVEL, ABC'S "REVENGE" OGN, CBR
VARIOUS INTERVIEWS WITH TED SULLIVAN, Scripts & Scribes

Year of birth missing (living people)
Living people
American male television writers
American film directors
University of Southern California alumni
American soap opera writers
American male writers
American male screenwriters